Showq-e Sofla (also Romanized as Showq-e Soflá; also known as Shogh Sofla, Showq, and Showq-e Pā’īn) is a village in Pariz Rural District, Pariz District, Sirjan County, Kerman Province, Iran. At the 2006 census, its population was 63, in 16 families.

References 

Populated places in Sirjan County